WRocK Online was a Metro Manila FM radio station and an Internet radio station owned by ACWS-United Broadcasting Network (also operating under the trade name WRocK Entertainment) in the Philippines. As an FM radio station, it operated under the call sign and frequency DWRK at 96.3 MHz, a frequency now used by 96.3 Easy Rock. The main format of the station was soft rock music.

History

DWBC/RK 96 Real Radio
ACWS (Associated Communications through Wireless Services)–United Broadcasting Network (UBN) established DWBC-FM in 1972, as a simulcast of 940 kHz. In 1980, RK 96  was launched (it also changed its callsign to DWRK). Headed by Mike Pedero (who established NU 107 in 1987), it played Lite Rock, competing with easy listening stations DZMB 90.7 (now 90.7 Love Radio) and Mellow Touch 94.7 (now Mellow 947) before reformatting in 1988.

96.3 WRocK
The station underwent rebranding and reformat as 96.3 WRocK with a Lite Rock format in 1988. The new format plays also love songs along with its lite rock songs. During the 1990s, it had a copyright infringement with 103.5 K-Lite with its use of the stinger "it's the true light rock" and "light rock with a kick". They also owned Ultravision 25 (now Net 25, owned by Eagle Broadcasting Corporation).

On February 28, 2003, Republic Act No. 9192 signed by then-Philippine President Gloria Macapagal Arroyo which renewed ACWS-UBN's license for another 25 years. The law granted ACWS-UBN a franchise to construct, install, establish, operate and maintain for commercial purposes and in the public interest, radio and/or television broadcasting stations in the Philippines.

During the 2000s until its acquisition by MBC, it hosted events and played music that inspired a generation up to October 26, 2008, when its DJ's aired the final edition of "Lite Rock Favorites of the Week" with DJs Cherry and Dylan Thomas.

On October 6, 2008, it has been announced that the Elizalde Group of Companies' Manila Broadcasting Company (MBC) has purchased WRocK from the Hodreal family, owners of ACWS-UBN, for PhP229.6 million.  Except for the acquisition price, further terms were not disclosed.

While the Manila radio station (DWRK – rebranded to 96.3 Easy Rock) is under the control of MBC, ACWS-UBN retains control of the WRocK provincial stations.

Rebirth & Later years
In October 2008, ACWS-UBN decided to re-establish the WRocK format online through the hayag.com online stream. Listeners were able to hear WRocK through webstreaming powered by Hayag, or through the WRocK Online website (requires Microsoft Silverlight).

Since May 2010, due to lack of resources and financial challenges, it suspended its operations indefinitely (as well as the Bacolod station). The Cebu & Davao stations still exist, with the latter being blocktimed by UMBN as Hit Radio then rebranded to Retro 95.5 in 2016.

Former Stations

Final DJs
Cherry Bayle (now with Radyo5 92.3 News FM)
Martha Del Rosario
Naomi Villa
Butch Allen
Mark Fournier
Jay Walk
Jimmy Dean
Ron Williams
Brian Penty
Dominic (now voiceover of Jeepney TV)
Noel Oliveros
Dylan Thomas
Joven
Rick Gonzalvo
Paul (now an alternate voiceover of GMA Network)
Sandy Kimseng
Angie Librea (Newscaster)
Lianne (Newscaster)
Faith Gonzalvo (Newscaster)
Sean Thomas

Awards
2000 Best FM Station in KBP Golden Dove Awards

Compilations of 96.3 WRocK
20 Years Of Lite Rock (Viva Records, 2008)
Love That Could've Been. But Could Never Be (MCA Music, 2008)

References

External links
WRocK online official site
WRocK online streaming through Hayag.com
 WRocK Online on Facebook

Defunct radio stations in Metro Manila
Internet radio stations in the Philippines
Radio stations established in 1972
Radio stations disestablished in 2010
1972 establishments in the Philippines
2010 disestablishments in the Philippines
Re-established companies